Cardinal Albert of Brandenburg before Christ on the Cross is a painting by Lucas Cranach the Elder. It is dated 1520–30. It was executed with oil on firs and measures 158 cm in height and 112 cm in width. Originally belonging to the Collegiate Church of Aschaffenburg, it passed in 1829 to the Alte Pinakothek in Munich, where it is shown with the title Kardinal Albrecht von Brandenburg vor dem Gekreuzigten kniend.

References

Collection of the Alte Pinakothek
1520s paintings
Renaissance paintings
Paintings depicting Jesus